Kulasekhara (Tamil: குலசேகரர்) (fl. 9th century CE), one of the twelve Vaishnavite alvars, was a bhakti theologian and devotional poet from medieval south India (Kerala). He was the author of Perumal Tirumoli in Tamil and "Mukundamala" in Sanskrit. The Perumal Tirumoli, whose second decade is known as "Tetrarum Tiral", is compiled as a part of Nalayira Divya Prabandham. The Trikkulasekharapuram Temple in Kodungallur was founded by the Alvar.

Vaishnavite traditions describe the Alvar as a king of the Chera royal family of the western coast (Kerala). Scholars identify Kulasekhara with royal Chera playwright Kulasekhara Varma and Sthanu Ravi Kulasekhara (ruled 844/45 – c. 870/71 AD), the earliest known Chera Perumal king of Kerala.

Sources 
Scholars generally identify Kulasekhara with Sthanu Ravi Kulasekhara, the earliest known Chera Perumal king of Kerala.
It is known that "Perumal Tirumoli" was recited in Srirangam Temple in 11th century AD. An inscription dated in the 18th regnal year of Chola king Kulottunga I, i. e. 1088 AD, mentions the daily recital of "Tetrarum Tiral" in the Srirangam Temple.
A record from Kulasekhara Alvar Koyil, Mannarkoyil, says that it was consecrated to the memory of Kulasekhara Perumal (by certain Vasudevan Kesevan of Mullappalli, Malai Mandalam). The earliest known inscription from the temple is dated to c. 1015 AD.
An inscription in Trikkulasekharapuram Temple in Kodungallur (dated in temple era 195) has been dated palaeographically to the 11th or 12th century AD.
A 13th century Tamil inscription from Bagan in Mandalay is prefaced by a sloka from Mukundamala. The inscription describes the construction of a mandapa for god Vishnu and the endowment for a lamp by Rayiran Chiriyan Kulasekhara Nampi from Makotayar Pattanam in Malai Mandalam.

Biography 

The following is the traditional biography of king Kulasekhara from sources generally dated to 12th-14th century AD.

Kulasekhara was born at Vanchi, in the western country, in Kali Era 28 to the Chera ruler Dridhavrata. When the prince came of age, his father abdicated the kingdom and retired from public life, and the new king Kulasekhara ascended the throne. 

Kulasekhara was a great devotee of god Vishnu. His piety was so great that on one occasion when the story was being narrated as to how demon king Ravana abducted princess Sita, he at once issued orders to marshal out his army for the invasion of Lanka. In another instance, a minister who felt jealous of the favor showered by the king on Vaishnavites, trumped up on the devotees a false charge. The king vindicated their innocence by inserting his own hand in a pot containing snakes and drawing it out unscathed.

Kulasekhara later threw off the reigns of kingdom and started out on a pilgrimage to the holy site of Srirangam. He spent there some years, worshiping his deity, and married his daughter Cherakula Valli Nachiyar to the Srirangam Temple. He also gave away his whole wealth as dowry, built the Chenaivenran Mandapa and repaired the prakara of the temple (which was thereafter called "Kulasekhara Tiruvidi"). He then visited the holy temples of Tiruvenkatam, Tiruvayodhya, Tillai-Chitrakutam, Tirukannapuram, Tirumalirunjolai and Tiruvitruvakkode and finally settled down at Brahmadesam near Tirukkurukur, the birthplace of Namma Alvar (where he died at the age of sixty seven).

The shrine of Cherakula Valli Nachiyar within the Srirangam Temple complex commemorates the daughter of king Kulasekhara.

Literary contributions 
Kulasekhara was the author of "Perumal Tirumoli" in Tamil and "Mukundamala" in Sanskrit.

Kulasekhara Alvar's poems are devotional in nature, being dedicated to the most prominent avataras of god Vishnu - Rama and Krishna. He identifies himself with several roles in the events of their lives. A devotee of god Rama, he considered the painful experiences of Rama or his aging father Dasaratha to be his own. His devotion was so intense that he worshipped the devotees as forms of Vishnu. In one song, he identifies himself with Devaki, the real mother of Krishna, from whom Krishna was taken away to Gokula where Nanda and Yasoda, the foster parents, looked after him. Kulasekhara expresses Devaki's desolation at being separated from her child and for union with him. In some poems, Kulasekhara also identifies himself with a gopi in love with god Krishna.

Kulasekhara Varma 
Kulasekhara Alvar is generally identified with Kulasekhara Varma, the medieval dramatist from the Chera royal family. Kulasekhara Varma describes himself as the Keralakula-chudamani or "the Crown Jewel of the Chera dynasty", the Keraladhinatha or "the King of the Chera Country" and Mahodayapura-paramesvara or "the Lord of the City of Makotai". He is known as the author of two Sanskrit plays called "Tapatisamvarana" and "Subhadradhananjaya" and the Sanskrit champu kavya "Ascharya Manjari" (perhaps also the author of the Sanskrit play "Vicchinnabhiseka"). An inscription from Chembra (954/55 AD) also mentions the performance of the play "Tapatisamvarana". 

The art-form known as Kudiyattam is traditionally associated Kulasekhara Varma and his courtier Tolan. "Dhananjaya Samvarana Dhvani", or the "Vyangyavyakhya", also mentions king Kulasekhara of Mahodayapuram. Kulasekhara Varma is sometimes identified with king Rama Kulashekhara (and as the patron of poet Vasubhatta). This identification is generally found unacceptable on several counts.

In popular culture
 The name of the British rock band Kula Shaker was inspired by Kulasekhara.

Notes

Further reading 
Perumal Tirumoli (ed. by M. Raghava Aiyangar, Ceraventar Ceyyutkovai, Trivandrum, 1951)
Mukundamala (1, ed. by T. A. Gopinatha Rao, Travancore Archaeological Series, II, II)
Mukundamala (1, ed. by K. R. Pisharoti, Annamalai, 2. ed. with commentary by V. V. Sharma, Trivandrum, 1947)
Tapatisamvarana (Trivandrum Sanskrit Series No. 11)
Subhadradhanjaya (Trivandrum Sanskrit Series No. 13)

References
Noburu Karashima (ed.), A Concise History of South India. New Delhi: Oxford University Press, 2014.
K. A. Nilakanta Sastri, The Colas (Madras, revised 2nd ed. 1955)
M. G. S. Narayanan, Perumals of Kerala. Thrissur (Kerala): CosmoBooks, 2013. 
S. K. Aiyengar, The Early History of Vaisnavism in India (Madras, 1920)
R. G. Bhandarkar, Vaisnavism, Saivism and other Minor Religious Systems (Poona, 1913).
A. S. R. Ayyar, "Kulasekhara Perumal", Travancore Archaeological Series, Volume, II.
K. R. Pisharoti, Kulasekharas of Kerala, Indian Historical Quarterly, VII.
K. G. Sesha Iyyer, "Kulasekhara Alvar and his Date",  Indian Historical Quarterly, VII.
Kerala Society Papers, Volume I (Trivandrum, 1928–32)
S. V. Pillai, History of Tamil Language and Literature (Madras, 1956)
K. K. Raja, The Contribution of Kerala to Sanskrit Literature (Madras, 1958)

Alvars
Bhakti movement
Sri Vaishnava religious leaders
Medieval Kerala
People of the Kodungallur Chera kingdom
9th-century Indian monarchs
Vaishnava saints
Kodungallur Chera kings
Tamil Hindu saints